Pind Makko is a village on western side of Mandi Bahauddin District in Punjab, Pakistan.

Name
The former name of the village is Makko Dudhi. Makko is the name of a person who owned the village and hence the village was named with this name after him. In English, the meaning of Pind is village. So with time the village got the name "Pind Makko".
Village Pind Makko is located on the western boundary of the district Mandi Bahauddin. It is relatively bigger village in its vicinity.

Popularity
The village is popular because of its active participation in district politics. It is between Miana Gondal and Miani. A railway station is also present here. This station has been built by the local funds raised by people of the area. This railway station is used for the export of fruits and vegetables from the village to the markets of different cities. It has a phone exchange that provides the facility of communication to the nearby villages.

Education 
Basic facilities of education is present in village.
Government High School for Boys is present in village and as well as for Girls

Agriculture 

The main agricultural products of the village include oranges, wheat, rice and sugar cane.

References

Villages in Mandi Bahauddin District